Fabrice Levet (born: 19 November 1959) is a sailor from Toulouse, France. who represented his country at the 1992 Summer Olympics in Barcelona, Spain as crew member in the Soling. With helmsman Marc Bouet and fellow crew member Alain Pointet they took the 15th place.

References

Living people
1959 births
Sailors at the 1992 Summer Olympics – Soling
Olympic sailors of France
European Champions Soling
Soling class world champions
French male sailors (sport)